The Diocese of Maiduguri is a Latin Church diocese of the Catholic Church located in the city of Maiduguri in the Ecclesiastical province of Jos in Nigeria.

History
 June 29, 1953: Established as Apostolic Prefecture of Maiduguri from Apostolic Prefecture of Jos
 June 7, 1966: Promoted as Diocese of Maiduguri

Special churches
The Cathedral is St Patrick's Cathedral in Maiduguri.

Bishops
 Prefects Apostolic of Maiduguri (Roman rite) 
 Father James Timothy Kieran Cotter, O.S.A. (1962.07.05 – 1966.06.07 see below)
 Bishops of Maiduguri (Roman rite)
 Bishop James Timothy Kieran Cotter, O.S.A. (see above 1966.06.07 – 1988.03.15)
 Bishop Senan Louis O’Donnell, O.S.A. (1993.09.18 – 2003.02.28)
 Bishop Matthew Man-oso Ndagoso (2003.02.28 - 2007.11.16), appointed Archbishop of Kaduna
 Bishop Oliver Dashe Doeme (6 Jun 2009 Appointed - present)
 John Bogna Bakeni, appointed Auxiliary Bishop of Maiduguri 12 April 2022

Other priests of this diocese who became bishop

 Stephen Dami Mamza, appointed Bishop of Yola in 2011

Persecution and insecurity 
Maiduguri was the diocese that suffered most from Boko Haram, having endured close to a decade of fierce persecution. Since 2020, however, the terrorist group has not carried out significant attacks in Maiduguri, a fact that Bishop Oliver Doeme attributes to divine intervention, in response to a Rosary prayer campaign he began after having a vision in which the Virgin Mary handed him a sword which turned into a Rosary. "The war was won on bended knee", he told journalists during a conference organised by Aid to the Church in Need, in July 2022. 

In the same conference he explained that his region of Nigeria is now relatively peaceful. "To a large extent we can say that the north-eastern part of the country is more peaceful than other parts, because Nigeria is now in crisis, and we are experiencing a lot of evil forces in our country. You have the Fulani herdsmen attacking Christian communities, you have the bandits attacking communities and taking people away. The church is not spared. In different parts of the north, priests have been killed. So, the crisis may be subsiding in the northeast, but not in other parts of the north and even in the south."

See also
Roman Catholicism in Nigeria

References

Sources
 GCatholic.org Information
 

Roman Catholic dioceses in Nigeria
Christian organizations established in 1953
Roman Catholic dioceses and prelatures established in the 20th century
Roman Catholic Ecclesiastical Province of Jos